Xiangyang is a town of Tian'e County, Guangxi, China. , it has 15 villages under its administration.

References

Towns of Hechi
Tian'e County